"Superstar" is a song recorded by South Korean pop duo Tohoshinki, taken from their fifth Japanese studio album, Tone (2011). It served as Tohoshinki's 32nd Japanese single, and their second as a duo. As the second and final single release for Tone, "Superstar" was released in four editions – a CD+DVD version, a CD only version, a Bigeast fan club edition, and an exclusive 7-Eleven edition – on July 20, 2011 by Avex Trax. The song "I Don't Know" was released as its B-side.

"Superstar" reached to number one on the Billboard Japan Hot 100 and number two on the Oricon Singles Chart. Within a week of its release, the single was certified gold by the Recording Industry Association of Japan (RIAJ) for shipments of over 100,000.

Background
"Superstar" was originally written with English lyrics and titled "Everyday Superstar". When the song was translated into Japanese the lyrics and meaning were completely changed apart from the single word "Superstar". Co-writer Lars Halvor Jensen told HitQuarters that the translator kept it in because "it's a catchy word that everybody understands". The original English language song was recorded by the Irish pop duo Jedward and included on their second album Victory. It was also included as the bonus track on the Japanese release of their debut album Planet Jedward.

"Superstar" was featured in a Seven-net Shopping commercial.

Music video
A music video for "Superstar" was shot, but was not included with the CD+DVD version of the single. It was later released on the album Tone. Both the music video's for "Superstar" and "I Don't Know" were included with the Tone as well as their respective dance versions.

Chart performance
The single was released July 20, 2011, and sold 75,687 units on its first day of release. It peaked at #1 on the daily chart and #2 of the weekly chart on the Oricon chart. The single sold over 184,317 copies.

Formats and track listings

Japanese digital download single
 "Superstar" – 3:43
 "I Don't Know" – 3:25

Japanese CD+DVD single AVCK-79027
Disc 1 (CD)
"Superstar"
"I Don't Know"
"Superstar" (Less Vocal) 
"I Don't Know" (Less Vocal)
Disc 2 (DVD)
"I Don't Know" (Video Clip)
"I Don't Know" Off Shot Movie (First Press Limited Edition only)

Japanese CD single AVCK-79028
"Superstar"
"I Don't Know" 
"Superstar" (-Summer Heat Remix-)
"Superstar" (Less Vocal) 
"I Don't Know" (Less Vocal)

Japanese CD single (Bigeast limited edition) AVC1-79029
"Superstar"
"I Don't Know" 
"Superstar" (Less Vocal) 
"I Don't Know" (Less Vocal)

Japanese CD+DVD single (7-Eleven edition) AVC1-79032
Disc 1 (CD)
"Superstar"
"I Don't Know"
Disc 2 (DVD)
Sogo Seibu's Silver Bear Silver Card TV-CM making
Seven-Net Shopping TV-CM making
7-Eleven Fair TV-CM making

Credits
Vocals: Tohoshinki (Yunho & Changmin)
Recording: Hideaki Jinbu (avex studio) ("Superstar") / JongPil Gu @ Yellowtail Studio ("I Don't Know")
Location: Avex Studio Azabu ("Superstar")/ Yellowtail Studio ("I Don't Know")
Mix engineers: Naoki Yamada (I to I communications) ("Superstar")/ JongPil Gu @ Yellowtail Studio ("I Don't Know")
Music: UTA for Tiny Voice Production ("Superstar")/ hitchhiker ("I Don't Know")
Music director: Katsutoshi Yasuhara (AEI) ("Superstar")/ hitchhiker ("I Don't Know")

Charts, peaks and certifications

Charts

Sales and certifications

Release history

References

External links
 TVXQ Official SMTOWN Website
 Tohoshinki Official Japanese Website

TVXQ songs
2011 singles
Billboard Japan Hot 100 number-one singles
Japanese-language songs
Songs written by Drew Ryan Scott
Songs written by Lindy Robbins
Songs written by Lars Halvor Jensen
2011 songs